Louis Joachim Marie François Giscard d'Estaing (born 20 October 1958) is a French politician and former member of the National Assembly of France. He is the son of the late President of France Valéry Giscard d'Estaing (1926–2020) and Anne-Aymone Giscard d'Estaing (née Sauvage de Brantes). He was a deputy for the Puy-de-Dôme department from 2002, when he held his father's old seat on his retirement, until 2012 when he was defeated by the Green candidate Danielle Auroi. He remains mayor of Chamalières, a post he has held since 2005. His father had also been mayor of Chamalières from 1967 to 1974.       

He was married to musicologist Nawal-Alexandra Ebeid (1959–2011) from 1996 until her death in 2011. She was born in Pasadena, California in 1959 and was a graduate of George Washington University. The couple had one son, Pierre-Louis Giscard d'Estaing. He remarried to Claire Labic in 2016.

Ancestry

References

1958 births
Living people
Politicians from Paris
Union for a Popular Movement politicians
Union of Democrats and Independents politicians
Deputies of the 12th National Assembly of the French Fifth Republic
Deputies of the 13th National Assembly of the French Fifth Republic
Regional councillors of Auvergne-Rhône-Alpes
Children of national leaders of France
French untitled nobility
Saint-Jean de Passy alumni
Paris 2 Panthéon-Assas University alumni
Mayors of places in Auvergne-Rhône-Alpes